Idlidlya Island (Ostrov Idlidlya) is a small island in the Chukchi Sea.

This island is only  in length.  There is a small Chukchi village called Neshkan on the coast close to the island.

The importance of this small island lies in the fact that many environmental observations, like monitoring of species, are taken from it.

History 
In October 2004 there was a severe oil spill and about 700 birds with oil-damaged plumage were found by hunters in the Chukotka shores. The environmental disaster affected the whole coast between the Neshkan peninsula and Idlidlya island.

See also 
 List of islands of Russia

References

External links 
 Satellite picture
  http://worldmaps.web.infoseek.co.jp/russia_guide.htm
 Environmental problems
 Bowhead whales near Idlidlya
 Environmental impact map (A. 1-3a)

Islands of the Chukchi Sea
Islands of Chukotka Autonomous Okrug